A royal consort is the spouse of a ruling monarch. Consorts of monarchs in the Duchy of Brittany and its predecessor states had no constitutional status or power, but many had significant influence over their spouse.  Listed are the wives of the Dukes of Brittany (some of whom claimed the title of King of Brittany) who were styled Duchesses of Brittany. Although there were six suo jure Duchesses of Brittany, the husbands of those duchesses were jure uxoris dukes and not consorts. Brittany is no longer a duchy and the title is currently not being used by the defunct Royal Family of France, so the position of Duchess of Brittany is vacant.  Little is known about the duchesses whose husbands reigned prior to the year 900 besides their names.

Not all wives of the monarchs became consorts, as they may have died, been divorced, or had their marriage declared invalid prior to their husband's accession to the throne, or married him after his abdication. Such cases include

 Beatrice of England, the second daughter of Henry III, King of England; only wife of John II (as the Earl of Richmond), married 22 January 1260, died 24 March 1275.
 Marie, Viscountess of Limoges, the second daughter of Guy VI, Viscount of Limoges; first wife of Arthur II (as heir to the duchy of Brittany), married 1275, died 1291.
 Isabelle of Valois, the eldest daughter of Charles I, Count of Valois; first wife of John III (as heir to the duchy of Brittany), married 1297, died 1309.
 Yolande of Anjou, the youngest daughter of Louis II of Anjou, King of Naples; first wife of Francis I (as heir to the duchy of Brittany), married 1431, died 1440.
 Margaret of Burgundy, the third daughter of John the Fearless, Duke of Burgundy; first wife of Arthur III (as Lord of Parthenay and Duke of Touraine (later Constable of France)), married 10 October 1423, died 2 February 1441.
 Jeanne d'Albret, the daughter of Charles II, Count of Dreux; second wife of Arthur III (as Lord of Parthenay and Constable of France), married 29 August 1442, died 1444.

Queen and Duchess of Brittany

Early duchesses and queens

The succession was interrupted by the Norman occupation (907–937)

House of Nantes

House of Rennes

House of Cornouaille

House of Penthièvre

House of Dreux

House of Montfort

See also
Countess of Dreux

Notes

Sources

Brittany
Brittany
 
Brittany, consorts
Consorts
Brittany, consorts
Brittany, List of royal consorts of
Lists of French women